Idris Kanu (born 5 December 1999) is a professional footballer who plays as a forward for  club Barnet. Born in England, he represents the Sierra Leone national team.

He began playing football with West Ham United at the age of 11 and spent six years with the club. He signed for Aldershot Town in October 2016 and at the age of 16 became the club's youngest ever player and goalscorer in league competitions. He joined Peterborough United for an undisclosed fee in August 2017, from where he was loaned out to Port Vale for the first half of the 2018–19 season and then Boreham Wood in the latter half of the season. He helped Peterborough to win promotion out of League One at the end of the 2020–21 season. He was loaned out to Northampton Town in January 2022 and sold on to Barnet in September 2022.

Club career

Early career
Kanu was recruited into the West Ham United academy at the age of 11 after impressing in a trial game for Barking and Dagenham district. He appeared for the "Hammers" Under-21 team at the age of 15. In September 2016, following his release from West Ham, he underwent a trial with Manchester United's Under-18 side and scored twice in a match against Middlesbrough. A permanent move failed to materialize, however, and Kanu later revealed he rejected an offer from the Premier League club in order to play senior football regularly.

Aldershot Town
On 7 October 2016, National League side Aldershot Town completed the signing of Kanu on an amateur contract after he had impressed during training sessions with the club. Upon signing, he was reunited with James Rowe, the club's assistant manager who he had previously worked with at West Ham. He made his debut the following day, coming on as a late substitute for Bernard Mensah in a 2–0 win over Solihull Moors at the Recreation Ground. In doing so, at the age of 16 years and 308 days, Kanu became the youngest player ever to feature for the "Shots" in a league match. He scored his first professional goal in the following match, netting in a 2–1 FA Cup defeat at home to Eastbourne Borough. Kanu's first league goal came on 12 November when he scored the opening goal in a 3–3 draw at Lincoln City. Upon scoring, Kanu broke another record by becoming the club's youngest ever goalscorer in league competition, aged 16 years and 343 days. On 5 December, he signed his first professional contract with the club on his 17th birthday, signing a two-and-a-half-year deal. He received his first ever red card the following year, when he was dismissed for two bookable offences in a 1–0 win over Dover Athletic on 17 April. Kanu ultimately scored five goals in 33 appearances across all competitions as Gary Waddock's side fell just short of promotion at the end of the 2016–17 season, losing out to Tranmere Rovers in the play-off semi-finals.

Peterborough United
On 1 August 2017, Kanu signed a three-year deal with League One side Peterborough United for an undisclosed fee. He made his English Football League debut for the club on 5 August, coming on as a second-half substitute for Junior Morias in a 2–1 win over Plymouth Argyle at London Road. Speaking at the end of the month, Peterborough manager Grant McCann said that he was very pleased with Kanu's progress. However, McCann was sacked and replaced by Steve Evans in February 2018  and Kanu had to wait until the last day of the 2017–18 season to make his first start, featuring in a 2–0 defeat at Portsmouth. Kanu made a total of 28 appearances during the campaign and Evans later announced that he would be made available to leave the club on loan the following season. Kanu scored his first goal for Peterborough in a 2–0 win over Northampton Town in an EFL Trophy tie on 3 September 2019.

On 28 June 2018, Kanu joined League Two side Port Vale on a season-long loan deal. On 29 September, he came off the bench to make his first league appearance at Vale Park and scored his first ever goal in the Football League with a header seven minutes into injury-time to secure a 1–1 draw with Exeter City. However, he started just three games and made a further four substitute appearances thereafter and was recalled to Peterborough on 3 January 2019.

On 4 January 2019, Kanu joined National League side Boreham Wood on a "long-term" loan deal; "Wood" manager Luke Garrard said that he was "very excited" to bring Kanu to Meadow Park. He made his debut the following day, opening the scoring in a 4–4 draw at Dagenham & Redbridge. He ended the 2018–19 season with four goals in 19 appearances for Boreham Wood.

He signed a new deal with Peterborough on 7 February 2020, which would keep him at the club until summer 2023; manager Darren Ferguson said that "I think he's got potential, so it's important we tied him down." He scored one goal in ten games during the 2019–20 season, which was ended early due to the COVID-19 pandemic in England, and was one of ten players to be taken off furlough in order to take part in one-on-one training with Ferguson. He scored his first goal for Peterborough on 27 March 2021, in a 7–0 thrashing of Accrington Stanley. He scored two goals in 25 games in the 2020–21 season as Peterborough secured promotion into the Championship with automatic promotion out of League One.

On 26 January 2022, Kanu joined League Two side Northampton Town on loan until the end of the 2021–22 season, having just returned from the Africa Cup of Nations. He started just one league game under Jon Brady, but did make five substitute appearances and started in the play-off semi-final first leg 2–1 defeat at Mansfield Town. He was an unused substitute in the return fixture at Sixfields Stadium, as the "Cobblers" lost the tie 3–1 on aggregate. Upon returning to Peterborough, he was transfer-listed by new manager Grant McCann.

Barnet
On 1 September 2022, Kanu signed for National League club Barnet for an undisclosed fee.

International career
Kanu was eligible to represent England as his country of birth, as well as Sierra Leone through his parental lineage. He received his first call up to the Sierra Leone national team for an Africa Cup of Nations qualifying game against Benin in June 2021. On 13 November 2021, Kanu made his debut for Sierra Leone, playing in a 2–0 loss against the Comoros. In December 2021, Kanu was named in the Sierra Leone squad for the delayed 2021 Africa Cup of Nations. Sierra Leone did not advance past the group stages after finishing third in Group E and Kanu was not named in any matchday squads.

Personal life
Kanu is a practicing Muslim and fasts during Ramadan.

Career statistics

Club

International

Honours
Peterborough United
EFL League One second-place promotion: 2020–21

References

1999 births
Living people
People with acquired Sierra Leonean citizenship
Sierra Leonean Muslims
Sierra Leonean footballers
Association football forwards
Sierra Leone international footballers
Footballers from Greater London
English Muslims
English footballers
Black British sportspeople
English sportspeople of Sierra Leonean descent
Aldershot Town F.C. players
Peterborough United F.C. players
Port Vale F.C. players
Boreham Wood F.C. players
Northampton Town F.C. players
Barnet F.C. players
National League (English football) players
English Football League players
2021 Africa Cup of Nations players